Drew Schiestel (born March 9, 1989) is a Canadian professional ice hockey defenceman who last played for Allan Cup Hockey (ACH) side Hamilton Steelhawks. He was previously with the Coventry Blaze in the British Elite Ice Hockey League (EIHL). Schiestel also played for fellow EIHL side Cardiff Devils.

Playing career
Schiestel was originally selected by the Buffalo Sabres in the 2nd round (59th overall) of the 2007 NHL Entry Draft and played within the Sabres organization predominantly with AHL affiliates, the Portland Pirates and the Rochester Americans. On July 29, 2013, Schiestel signed as a free agent to a one-year AHL contract to return to his native Hamilton with the Bulldogs.

On August 30, 2014, Schiestel left North America as a free agent and signed his first contract abroad in Germany on a one-year contract with Düsseldorfer EG of the Deutsche Eishockey Liga. Schiestel continued his European career after one season in Germany, signing with Danish club Rungsted IK of the Metal Ligaen on August 21, 2015.

After two seasons in Europe, Schiestel opted to return to North America for the 2016–17 season, agreeing to terms on a one-year deal with the Indy Fuel of the ECHL on October 6, 2016. In the 2016-17 season with the Fuel, Schiestel appeared in just 14 games with 5 assists before opting to return abroad, signing a one-year deal with Hungary's Fehérvár AV19 of the Austrian Hockey League.

In November 2018, Schiestel moved to the UK to sign for the Cardiff Devils - later winning the 2018–19 play-off title with the club.

In June 2019, Schiestel moved to league counterparts, the Coventry Blaze. On September 6, 2019, Schiestel was named as the Blaze captain for the 2019-20 EIHL season.

Career statistics

References

External links

1989 births
Living people
Fehérvár AV19 players
Buffalo Sabres draft picks
Canadian ice hockey defencemen
Canadian expatriate ice hockey players in Croatia
Canadian expatriate ice hockey players in Hungary
Canadian expatriate ice hockey players in Norway
Canadian expatriate ice hockey players in Germany
Cardiff Devils players
Coventry Blaze players
Düsseldorfer EG players
Greenville Road Warriors players
Hamilton Bulldogs (AHL) players
Indy Fuel players
Lørenskog IK players
KHL Medveščak Zagreb players
Mississauga IceDogs players
Niagara IceDogs players
Portland Pirates players
Rochester Americans players
Texas Stars players
Wheeling Nailers players
Ice hockey people from Ontario
Sportspeople from Hamilton, Ontario
Canadian expatriate ice hockey players in the United States
Canadian expatriate ice hockey players in Denmark
Canadian expatriate ice hockey players in Wales
Canadian expatriate ice hockey players in England